is a Japanese professional footballer who plays as striker for Samut Prakan of the Thai League 3.

Club career statistics

References

External links
 Kazuo Honma Interview (1)
 Kazuo Honma Interview (2)
 Kazuo Honma Interview (3)

1980 births
Living people
People from Yokohama
Japanese footballers
Association football forwards
Thespakusatsu Gunma players
FK Mačva Šabac players
Tisza Volán SC footballers
Lombard-Pápa TFC footballers
Diósgyőri VTK players
Nyíregyháza Spartacus FC players
BFC Siófok players
Vasas SC players
Ferencvárosi TC footballers
Nemzeti Bajnokság I players
Lao Toyota F.C. players
Japanese expatriate footballers
Expatriate footballers in Serbia and Montenegro
Expatriate footballers in Hungary
Expatriate footballers in Laos
Japanese expatriate sportspeople in Serbia
Japanese expatriate sportspeople in Hungary
Japanese expatriate sportspeople in Laos